Krukenberg's spindle is the name given to the pattern formed on the inner surface of the cornea by pigmented iris cells that are shed during the mechanical rubbing of posterior pigment layer of the iris with the zonules that are deposited as a result of the currents of the aqueous humor. The sign was described in 1899 by Friedrich Ernst Krukenberg (1871-1946), who was a German pathologist specialising in ophthalmology.

Diagnosis

Differential diagnosis

Iritis 

Painful red eye with photophobia associated with inflammation

Vortex keratopathy 

 Corneal deposits also known as cornea verticillata, caused by netarsudil eye drops or chronic amiodarone use for cardiac arrhythmias.

Corneal guttata 

 Non-transparent collagen deposits appearing following loss of corneal endothelial cells

See also 

 Pigment dispersion syndrome

References

External links 

Medical signs
Eye diseases